Gudny or Guðný is a Nordic female given name, which means "she who the gods make young." Gudny is popular in the Nordic countries and was the 18th most popular female name in Iceland in 2004 . The name may refer to

Gudný Jenny Ásmundsdóttir (born 1982), Icelandic handball player
Guðný Halldórsdóttir (born 1954), Icelandic film director
Guðný Björk Óðinsdóttir (born 1988), Icelandic football player

See also
Icelandic name
Given names